John Charles Evans (31 January 1897 – 1939) was a Welsh professional footballer who played as a wing half.

During his time with Grimsby Town, Evans also played cricket for Grimsby Cricket Club and worked as the club's groundsman. He later played for Barry in the 1927–28 season. He died in Frome Hospital in 1939.

References

1897 births
1939 deaths
Footballers from Cardiff
Welsh footballers
Association football wing halves
Cardiff Camerons F.C. players
Cardiff City F.C. players
Northampton Town F.C. players
Grimsby Town F.C. players
Barry Town United F.C. players
English Football League players